Jay Henderson may refer to:
 Jay Henderson (ice hockey)
 Jay Henderson (footballer)
 Jay Henderson (basketball)